Darul Uloom Deoband is an Islamic seminary in India at which the Deobandi movement began. It was established by the Indian Muslim theologians in the wake of the failure of War of Independence 1857 which had caused the abolition of Mughal Empire and politico-economic predicament of the South Asian Muslims. It aimed at reforming and uplifting the Muslim society on orthodox lines, and preserving the Muslim culture from the influence of modernism, Christian and Hindu missionary activities. It is located in Deoband, a town in Saharanpur district, Uttar Pradesh.

Although Darul Uloom Deoband disseminated orthodox and traditional education among Indian Muslims, yet it advised innovative administrative and structural strategies to appeal to the common masses. Fund raising from the common public instead of engaging elitist social segment, organizing the curricula, academic and administrative paraphernalia replicating the English bureaucratic model, and adopting Urdu as a medium of instruction, all were the measure which were unprecedented in the educational history of the Muslims of South Asia. These strategies helped introduce a new educational and literary culture: breaking up the monopoly of those recognized to be the religious elites, stressing upon the necessity of Arabic and Persian languages; attracting the common people towards acquiring religious knowledge; promoting the Urdu language and spreading it out in the areas other than where it had evolved.

Background

Foundation 

The British response to the Mutiny of 1857, thousands of Muslim mutineers were shot dead, and many mosques and madrasas were destroyed as a result of brutal attacks of the British Raj. The Mutiny and consequent fall of the Mughal Empire caused termination of financing to the Muslims education and madrasas in Delhi. Worried for the financing and growth of Madrasas, the founders of Darul Uloom Deoband initiated classes in the Chatta Mosque of Deoband in 1866. The first tutor was Mahmud Deobandi (d. 1886) and his first student was Mahmud Hasan Deobandi alias Shaykh al-Hind (1851-1920), who later on played a key role in administering madrasa affairs. The prominent figures revered as the founding fathers include: Rashid Ahmad Gangohi (1826-1905), Yaqub Nanautawi (1833-84), Rafiuddin Deobandi (1836-90), Sayyid Muhammad Abid (1834-1912), Zulfiqar Ali (1819-1904), Fazlur Rahman Usmani (1831-1907) and Muhammad Qasim Nanautavi (1832-80). Reflecting on the growth and functioning of Darul Uloom, Muhammad Moj in his undertaking The Deoband Madrassah Movement: Countercultural Trends and Tendencies states that one madrasa was not enough to fulfil the founders goal of preserving and protecting Muslim culture in India, they consequently founded many others on same pattern in the Upper Doab area of North India. By the end of 1880, at least fifteen madaris comprehensively following the model of the mother school were working in Deoband, and by the end of the nineteenth century the fifty-plus madaris were functional in India.

Vision and Objectives 
In the Muslim world, Darul Uloom Deoband has been a pragmatic example of religious intellectual manifestation, knowledge production and political struggle against the oppressor and imperialist forces. The failure of Indian Rebellion of 1857 left Muslims in a state of extreme despair and political decline, the enthusiastic religious luminaries madrasa set up a new religious center at a small town of Deoband aimed at preserving the socio-religious values and culture of the Indian Muslims under British Raj. They intended to bring renaissance of the glorious and great past of the Muslims by the means of educational empowerment, opting for militant struggle while finding it necessary and feasible, participating in modern political mechanism introduced by the British Raj in South Asia, and developing the institutions of providing religious guidance as to social, economic and cultural affairs of day-to-day life. Syed Mehboob Rizwi writes that at this time of Muslims predicament, the theologians basically felt it essential to establish a religious as well as scholarly seminary which could imperatively contribute in awakening of the religious consciousness of the Muslims and their nationalization. Therefore, it was decided that such a seminary should be established in Deoband instead of Delhi. A veteran of Indian Rebellion of 1857 and a renowned religious scholar, Imdadullah Muhajir Makki (1817-99) when informed that a madrassa had been established in Deoband, exclaimed and replied: “Subhan Allah! You say we have established a madrasa. It is unknown fact that how many foreheads, at times of dawn, kept on prostrating and grumbling that God forbid! Create the means of survival of Islam and protection of knowledge in India. This madrasa is the fruit of those dawn prayers.”

This statement by Muhajir Makki shows how deeply the religious leadership of the Indian Muslims felt about Muslims predicament and survival of their religio-cultural entity. They were looking for a way to preserve Islamic values and culture and to uplift their socio-political status by empowering them through knowledge, which they found they could do by establishing a Deoband seminary. The basic principles and objectives of the method devised by Muhammad Qasim Nanautavi (1833-80) considering the unfavorable conditions after the Indian Rebellion of 1857 were: inspiring people to acquire the knowledge of religious sciences and arts, popularizing the philosophy and teaching of Shah Waliullah Dehlawi (1703-62), responding to objections on Islam raised by Christians and Hindus, spreading the message of the Book and Sunnah among both the Muslim and non-Muslim classes, shedding off the dependency of the institution and mobilizing the resources from within the Muslim community to materializ the envisaged objects, adopting the language of ordinary Indians as a medium of instructions except for the Islamic disciplinary and philosophic lexicons, promoting scientific and intellectual awareness, and adhering to the principle of non-violence. The above argument displays well that Darul Uloom was not merely a formal academic institution but it intended to attain lofty political and cultural goals. It was shortly after the demise of Muhammad Qasim Nanautavi that among the leading exponents of Darul Uloom its objectives became a subject of disagreement. Some of its dignitaries considered it appropriate to confine the mission and activities to education and learning only, recognizing it a fundamental cause of its establishment. Whereas, some overwhelmingly argued that the purpose of Deoband seminary was not merely confined to imparting education but reforming the society and offering organized struggle to tackle serious national and political problems faced by South Asian Muslims, and gaining independence from the oppression of British Raj. The ground realities of contemporary political arena has made its goals and objectives controversial among the scholars and students of the madrasa, divided on two opposing directions. Anxious about the madrasa being blamed of supporting jihadist activities and being dubbed as the promoter of violence, the exponents intended to confine the scope of its activities to the teaching and learning. Others who opposed it opined that its establishment was not merely for academics, but to restore the lost Islamic grandeur and dignified status of India Muslims through a practical struggle against the oppressors. They considered the earlier ones to be straying away from the path of the founding fathers of the Deoband movement, even guilty of misrepresenting their jihadist contribution.

New Strategies and Trends 
The Darul Uloom Deoband was established to impart traditional religious education to the Muslim of India and it has never been faltered in its commitment. However, it adopted modern means to facilitate its mission and to attract the people towards its cause of preserving Muslim culture and traditions in South Asia. In his Revival from Below: The Deoband Movement and Global Islam, Brannon D. Ingram include a chapter “A Modern Madrasa” wherein he attempted to establish it that: “[I]t is too simple to view Deoband as “traditional” in some respect (for instance, in terms of accentuating Hadith and Islamic law) and “modern” in others (institutionally and administratively resembling a British college more than a classic madrasa, for example). It proposes, rather, that tradition and modernity are so co-constitutive that Deoband’s traditionalism is what makes Deoband modern. Deobandi valorization of “tradition—seen, for instance, in its privileging of “transmitted” knowledge above its “rational” counterpart (ma’qulat)… is hard to conceive before colonial modernity and attendant discourses of the Indian secular gave new meaning to tradition itself. Moreover, while the texts that Deobandi scholars study are not modern, the idiom through which that learning to the public is, in part because “the public” itself is largely (though not exclusively) modern…” To excel in educational standards and popularization of the Islamic education, Darul Uloom’s three distinct strategies are mention worthy: first, the public fund raising; second, emulation of English bureaucratic organization of the educational institution; and third, adaptation of Urdu as medium of instruction. These initiatives expres enough about the structural modernist tendencies of the madrasa.

Fund Raising Strategy 
It was during the Sultanate and Mughal eras that the religious seminaries were granted patronage by the courts of the Muslim rulers and aristocrats. They were consequently bound to abide by the state’s religious policies and to endorse them, which more often than were to serve the vested interests of the rulers than collective society. Another impact of such kind financing to madrasas was the alliance between the rulers and the ulema, among whom the fanatic ones often sought to find the opportunities to influence the behavior and mindset of the rulers to adopt the aggressive religious policies towards the non-Muslim communities under their rule. Diverting from this tradition of financing of educational institutions, Darul Uloom Deoband, instead of collecting funds from royal or noble families, preferred to receive the public donations, which brought about twofold impact: it enabled the madrasa to take its decisions independently on the one hand, and the general public to identify themselves with it on the other. The people coming from all segments and all walks of life contributed with what they could for the foundation. These factors indeed enhanced its reputation among the people as well as the standardization of the education and merit.

Education

Modern Organization and Bureaucratization of the Madrasa 
The establishment of the Deoband madrasa was a watershed event in the history of Islamic religious educational institutions. The founders and administrators emulated English structure of organization to run its educational, academic and administrative affairs. The madrasa was not adjunct to home or mosque. Gradually, it attained classrooms and central library with possible facilities and in accordance with immediate requirements. The professionally trained staff was appointed to educate and train the students, and to deal with the administrative functions. The students were enrolled to study well-defined curriculum during a fix time period, and after the completion of their courses they were awarded with prizes in the convocation ceremonies. The madrasa was unique in its strategic planning as compared to the prior ones, as it issued annual printed reports highlighting and evaluating the progress and achievements. Reflecting on these distinguished characteristics of the madrasa, Barbara D. Metcalf admires it as “unusual” and “a distinctive institution” and its system as “novel.” Showing its moderate behavior, Darul Uloom has always welcomed non-Muslim students, its policy was to accept Hindu students as well.

Adoption of Urdu as Medium of Instruction 
In the history of Islamic religious education in South Asia, it was a groundbreaking decision on the part of Darul Uloom Deoband that the language of the common people and indigenous nomenclature should be given a high importance for delivering religious educations. This was, in more than one way, a major development towards uplifting the confidence and social status of the people belonging to the lower classes. It was first time in the history of South Asian madaris that Urdu as a medium of instruction was given preference over Arabic and Farsi (Persian). Arabic then was a language of religious elites, whereas Persian was adopted by court bureaucrats. The promulgation of Urdu by administrators of the institution as a medium of instruction was primarily a tactic of making theological education more intelligible and accessible for the general public. Persian and Arabic had symbiotic significance for the elites, while Urdu evolved to be the lingua franca of South Asian Muslims mainly belonging to the lower ranks and social status. The most terrible cultural repercussion of providing education in Persian and Arabic was that it created a sense of alienation between the ruling migrant—from Central Asia and Middle East to India—and native subjects. Urdu being a language which originated and evolved in India helped express positive gesture and bring both social segments closer which, so far, had deeply distinct cultural legacy. It can also be observed that contemporarily Darul Uloom is no more critical of the use of English in educational pursuits.

Politics

Struggle against British Imperialism 
One of the most intriguing issues pertinent to the Darul Uloom Deoband Movement was the way it responded to British imperialism and what kind of political philosophy it espoused to confront with this challenge. It appeared to be a staunch opponent of the East India Company and the British Raj in India. The anti-imperialist struggle and strategies may be divided into three dominant trends:
 The militant struggle against East India Company in Mutiny of 1857;
 The Reshmi Rumal Movement to overthrow the British rule in India;
 The nationalist politics marked by the founding of a political party Jamiat Ulema-e-Hind and collaboration with the Indian National Congress.

In the Revolt of 1857, under the leadership of their teacher Imdadullah Muhajir Makki (1817-99), two dignified figures among the founding fathers of Darul Uloom Deoband Muhammad Qasim Nanautavi and Rashid Ahmad Gangohi, rebelled and fought against the British forces. They, defeating the British troops, captured the town of Shamli in Muzaffarnagar. Following the foundation of Darul Uloom, its major proponents and ideologues, decided to distance themselves away from active politics for the time being in order to avoid British hostility. They had realized that the Muslim community needed to be strengthened first, lest they lose the battle against the British and their objective of grabbing political control from them could not be materialized. Shaykh al-Hind Mahmud Hasan Deobandi observed World War I as a chance to transform the Deoband movement to militancy. He reached Mecca on October 9, 1915, where he met Ghalib Pasha, who was one of the Ottoman Empire’s most powerful governors.

The Governor pleaded with him to lend his assistance to the Allies in their fight against the British Empire in the course of World War I. He sent a long message to the Indian Muslims, urging them to keep fighting against British imperialism and assuring them that they will regain power from their oppressors. The conflict was viewed as a great opportunity by the freedom fighters to strike at the heart of British interests. They prepared themselves once again for militant uprisings against the British forces. Ubaidullah Sindhi (1872-1944) was sent by Shaykh al-Hind Maulana Mahmud Hasan to Kabul as a delegate, meanwhile he himself went to Arabia. Obaidullah Sindhi wrote a letter to Shaykh al-Hind Mahmud Hasan in Arabia, explaining to him the activities he performed in Kabul. He narrated the plan of the exiled freedom fighters and mentioned names of persons directing the campaign against the British from India. They expected to launch popular mobilization and agitation campaigns as well as a tremendous armaments drive from all corners of the country. The message they intended to spread among their supporters was written on a piece of silk cloth. The British administrators intercepted this secret plot in time, and dubbed it as a “Silk Letter Movement.” Following the unveiling of the Silk Letters Conspiracy and the downfall of Ottoman Empire (Khilafat) at the end of World War I, the ulema of Darul Uloom Deoband actively participated in the Khilafat Movement and backed Mahatma Gandhi’s Non-cooperation movement. This was the third watershed phase in the history Darul Uloom Deoband Movement’s anti-imperialist politics, when it strategized to work closely with the Indian National Congress (INC), by recognizing, adopting, and participating in the democratic process introduced by the British Raj in colonial India. At this juncture, the veterans of Deoband school of thought including Kifayatullah Dehlawi (1875-1952), Abdul Halim Siddiqui, and Abdul Bari Firangi Mahali (1878-1926) formally formed a political party in 1919, giving it a name; Jamiat Ulema-e-Hind (literal meaning, the Party of Indian Theologians) intending to pursue their political interests as a part of mainstream politics. After the partition of India, the political activities were carried out by the leadership of the party inside Pakistan under the name Jamiat Ulema-e-Islam. Another political party which promoted socialist tendencies and closely worked with Indian National Congress, but was immensely inspired by religious philosophy and ideology of Deoband school of thought, was Majlis-e Ahrar-e Hind. Jamiat Ulama-e Hind and Majlis-e Ahrar working in South Asian political environment, played a vital role in the freedom struggle and anti-communalist politics.

Nationalist Politics 
The fact that Darul Uloom declared self-independence as its political goal in 1917, much before the Indian National Congress, reveals enough about the nature of its political concerns, future strategy and activity. Jamait Ulema-e Hind supported the Indian National Congress’s nationalist philosophy and opposed the Two-nation theory along with the concept of India’s division. It instigated Indian Muslims to vote for the Indian National Congress endorsing the freedom of United India and denying creation of Pakistan in 1947. Jamiat Ulema-e Hind although, no longer a significant political force, still continues to exercise its political strength and force to help Muslims resolve communal issues. Darul Uloom has always seen Muslims as a community which has to be reinforced, but it does not support the notion of an Islamic state, which was promoted by the All-India Muslim League in the 1940s. It advocates for a secular government system that allows people to practice their religion freely. It advocates for a secular governmental state that would allow all religious communities to practice their faith freely. If one overlooks those Deoband ulema who supported the cause of All India Muslim League to attain a separate Muslim state, i.e. Pakistan, an inaccurate picture of the Darul Uloom Deoband’s role in the freedom movement is portrayed. These included Ashraf Ali Thanwi, Shabbir Ahmad Usmani, and Zafar Ahmad Usmani. Acknowledging the services of these ulema, Shabbir Ahmad Usmani was honoured to raise the flag of Pakistan in Karachi and Zafar Ahamd Usmani, in Dhaka. Once, the Quaid-i-Azam Muhammad Ali Jinnah was asked whether there was any Islamic cleric who authenticated the division of India on religious bases. Jinnah replied that there was Arshraf Ali Thanwi, and his support to the cause of Muslim League was enough. Shabbir Ahmad Usmani and Zafar Ahmad Usmani, because of their different approach as compared to the Indian nationalist approach of Jamiat Ulama-e Hind, formed another political part namely Jamiat Ulama-e Islam in 1945. After the partition of India, it along with other politico-religious parties such as Jamaat-e Islami in Pakistan, endeavored to affect the legislative and constitutional framework of the country. It thus appears that the political parties formed by Deoband theologians based upon different political standings somehow became instrumental in promoting and popularizing Deoband strand of Islam in South Asia.

Contribution

Fatwa Issuing-system 
Islam is known to provide its followers a comprehensive code of ethics and conduct through divine legislation—i.e. The Quran and Sunnah—and the knowledge of its interpretation through certain well-defined principle is known as fiqh. Over the course of Islamic history, the Muslims have been consulting the Islamic jurists (i.e. mufti) for the expert opinion (fatwa) to regulate their day-to-day social, economic and religious affairs. Though the knowledge of fiqh originated in the 
lifetime of the Prophet of Islam Muhammad, its significance grew when the Muslim World expanded through conquests and a big number of non-Muslims entered the fold of Islam. They carried a legacy of their early culture and religions and wanted to regulate their lives according to the guidance of Islam. Ifta or system of issuing, hence, helped those guidance seekers deal with their challenges and norms of Islamic civilization be established and prevailed. Observing these developments, Professor Nazeer Ahmed puts it: “The new Muslims brought with them not only their ancient heritage and culture, but methods of looking at the sublime 
questions of life in ways fundamentally different from that of the Arabs. Historical Islam had to face the rationalism of the Greeks, the stratification of the Zoroastrians, the gnosticism of the Hindus, the abnegation of the Buddhists and the secular but highly refined ethical codes of the Taoist and Confucian Chinese. Add to it the internal convulsions in the Islamic world arising out 
of the conflicting claims of the Umayyads, the Hashemites, the Ahl-al Bait and the partisan and fractious approach of the many parties to legal issues, and one has a good idea of the challenge faced by the earliest Islamic jurists. Fiqh was the doctrinal response of the Islamic civilization to these challenges.”

In context to British colonization of India and their attempts at 
modernizing its society and culture, the exponents of Darul Uloom Deoband perceived these developments as an assault on their cultural and 
religious integrity and feared about the disintegration of Muslim community. They, thus decided to significantly contribute in simplifying the socio-cultural order of Muslims in South Asia. They did this by instituting a system of individual Fatwas. In his critical appraisal of the fatwas issued by Darul Uloom Deoband, M. Riyaz Hashami mentions quite interesting facts. He states that Darul Ifta, one of the sub-
organization of Darul Uloom Deoband, has been issuing fatwas for the past 125 years and it receives over fifteen thousand fatwa petitions every year from diverse nations to resolve the conflicting status of socio-religious issues, regardless of their purpose or significance. A total of six thousand to seven thousand fatwas concerning socio-religious matters (i.e. duties and rights, what are permissible and what are forbidden by Islam) and politico-cultural challenges (as to disputes, agreements, disagreements, and breach of agreements) faced by Muslims living across the world are being sought online. Historically speaking, the system of issuing fatwa introduced by Darul Uloom Deoband had far-reaching implications. Prior to it, during the Mughal period, the Mufti used to give a fatwa to the qazi (or Judges) as a guide, as the rulers did not want the people to have direct guidance. They wanted to regulate the religious affairs through state institutions. This was because they were threatened by direct guidance, or misguidance, which might cause unrest among the people as to the incompliance of their policies with the religious teachings. The contemporarily adopted strategy by Deoband ulema, and also followed by other Muslim religious organizations, therefore, contributed to the much-debated issue of individual fatwa in its current form. These fatwas have had a huge impact on the general public seeking out religious guidelines and have prompted individuals to make their self-accountability and to regulate the complexities of their social, marital, cultural and economic affairs of day-to-day life under the expert and well-qualified guidance of the Muslim theologians.

Deoband School 

Darul Uloom Deoband Movement, which began in a little hamlet in North India called Deoband, by adopting dynamic strategies in persuasion of its goals and making immense contribution in socio-cultural and political life of the South Asia Muslims, has grown into one of in-vogue sects of Islam. It has made this possible by expanding the network of sub-institutions or connecting with other institutions having similar ideological orientation across India as well as other parts of the world. The Tablighi Jamaat (literal meaning the Missionary Organization) was founded by Deoband ulema with the aim of spreading Islam all over the world. Originally founded in 1920s by Muhammad Ilyas who was greatly inspired by the spiritual ideology of his mentor Rashid Ahmad Gangohi, the Tablighi Jamaat though initiated for spiritual development of the individuals, intended to counter the activities of the Christian missionaries and Hindu revivalist movements such Shuddhi (literal meaning, purification) launched by Vedic scholar and founder of Arya Samaj named Swami Dayanand Saraswati (1824-83) and Sanghaton (literal meaning unification) initiated by his follower Swami Shraddhanand (1856-1926). Thus, its main objective at the time of its formation was to prevent the Muslims converting to be Christians and Hindus. However, It is currently recognized as a transnational nonpolitical organization working to promote Islam’s core ideology and belief system. There have been strong arguments in the past over its links and networking with the Taliban and other Jihadi organizations.

As to the anti-imperialist struggle of the Darul Uloom, it went through three historical phases: first, was the participation of its founding fathers in War of Independence 1857; secondly, it conspired to overthrow British Raj from India collaborating with Turkey, Germany, Afghanistan and Indian princely states, which is said to be Reshmi Rumal Movment. After the disclosure of this plan of staging rebellion at the hands of British government, the third phase came when Deoband theologians decide to enter the mainstream politics and formed a political party called Jamiat Ulama-e Hind demanding freedom of India. During Khilafat movement, its veterans collaborated with Indian National Congress and endorsed Indian nationalist ideology. Majalas-e Ahrar-e Hind, another political organization which closely worked with Congress, was also religiously inspired by Deoband ideology. The theologians who differed from Indian nationalist approach of Jamiat Ulama-e Hind and supported All Indian Muslim League formed separate political party namely Jamiat Ulama-e Islam which has rendered great deal of services in political and constitution development of Pakistan. These political parties along with other proselytizing organization like Tablighi Jamaat and Darul Ifta has been instrumental in promoting and popularizing the ideology and philosophy of Deoband school of thought. It is one of the major sect of Islam in the contemporary world.

Centenary Celebration 

Its centennial conference was held on March 21, 22 and 23, 1980. The conference was inaugurated by Abdallah Ben Abdel Mohsen At-Turki, the representative of the Saudi Arabian king, and included Quran recitation by Abdul Basit 'Abd us-Samad from Egypt, an opening speech by the Madrasa's rector, Qari Muhammad Tayyib, and a speech by the Indian Prime Minister, Indira Gandhi. The conference concluded with a prayer by Qari Muhammad Tayyib and was broadcast live on the All India Radio. A 100 hectares area was prepared for the conference, with the number of participants ranging from 1.5 to 2 million, including 18,000 participants from outside the Indian subcontinent. In this gathering, more than ten thousand Madrasa graduates are awarded with honorary turban. In addition to supporting the Afghan mujahideen, the conference also included several initiatives against the Russian invasion in Afghanistan through the efforts of Minnatullah Rahmani. Alongside the main conference, a special seminar was organized to discuss the responsibilities and curriculum of the madrasa at Darul Hadith.

Criticism

Terrorism 
One of the crucial concerns for which the Deoband Movement has attracted the attentions of heated intellectuals on international scholarly forums over its alleged links with militant groups and its stance about the issue of terrorism. This growing apprehension appeared after the incident of 9/11, as the Afghan Taliban professed the Deoband 
version of Islam and its top brass leadership received education from the Deoband Madrasahs. Added to this, one of the reasons behind this 
understanding was the involvement of founding fathers of the movement 
in jihadist activities during colonial period, as is discussed above. From 2006 to 2008, various terrorist attacks were held in major cities of India and consequently the Muslim population had to face witch-hunt and 
victimization by the police. It however, would be a fallacious assumption to associate the ideology of Darul Uloom as militant one, without going into the historical dynamics of the its founding fathers’ involvement in revolt against British Raj in India, and ignoring its efforts to reconcile with modernism and the process of democratization of India. Moreover, the emergence of Taliban and other terrorist groups in South Asian states need to be evaluated in a specific context of international political developments as well as the regional socio-cultural constraints 
and economic deprivations. This however can be noticed that the ulema representing this school of thought, realising the seriousness of such blames, convoked a large scale All India Anti-Terrorism Conference on 25th February, 2008; wherein the ulema issued the verdicts against the all kinds of terrorist activities, unjust violence, brutalities and killing of innocent people. Ulema from all corners of Indian representing myriad sects participated in the conference and a joint verdict on condemnation of terrorism was 
unanimously ratified by ulema representing Nadwatul Ulama Hind, Jamat-e Islami Hind, Jamaat-e Islami, All India Muslim Law Board and Rabta Madaris-e Islamia (All India Madrasah Association). On 31st May 2008, Islamic clerics who were more than 100,000 in numbers issued similar ‘fatwa against terrorism and unjust violence’ in public rally held 
in Delhi, led by Darul Uloom Deoband based in Uttar Pradesh. The venerated ulema of the Muslim community of India expressed their grave concerns on ‘sinister campaign’ to malign Islam by associating it with terror, and on wrong interpretations of Quranic verses 
or ahadith to give any justification for the bloodshed of the innocent people. Habibur Rehman acknowledged as the Grand Mufti of Darul Uloom Deoband, stated that “Islam rejects all kinds of violence, breach of peace, bloodshed, murder and plunder and does not 
allow it in any form.” Condemning terrorist acts anywhere in the world, President of Jamiat Ulama-e Hind Arshad Madani expressed it 
that “the voice we raised here will not be confined to Deoband. We will 
oppose terrorism to every nook and corner of India. We will take this anti-terrorism initiative to every state, every city and every town of the country.” The conference, according to Maulana Madani, was “beginning of a country-wide movement against terrorism and injustice.” Convening of All India Anti-Terrorism Conference (2008) has 
appeared to be a historical event leaving immense impact on socio-
cultural and political identity and status of South Asian Muslims, and 
particularly vulnerable Muslim minority community in India. Through 
this platform, Darul Uloom disseminated the massage of disowning and divorcing all those the individuals and organizations involved in terrorist 
activities either in India or elsewhere. This led to improve the confidence 
of the Muslim masses who felt themselves alienated in multi-religious society, and contributed in mitigating the impression of Muslims’ 
peaceful coexistence with other religious communities. This has also 
improved the image of the Deoband madrasas in India, Pakistan and 
Bangladesh; the clerics associated with them thoroughly denounce unjust 
violence and any of its form in the name of Islam. Darul Uloom’s initiative for spreading peace and rejecting means of terror to gain political dominancy is welcomed by the largest Muslim population, non-Muslim communities and the states which felt compelled to restructure their policies of witch-hunt and shootout. The states, nonetheless, need to devise more comprehensive policies to involve the madrasas in the national solidarity programs and inter-faith harmony initiatives.

See also 
 List of Deobandi madrasas
 List of Darul Uloom Deoband alumni
 Bibliography of Darul Uloom Deoband

References

External links 

Darul Uloom Deoband
Islamic architecture
Deobandi Islamic universities and colleges
Maturidi
Islamic education in India
Madrasas in India
Educational institutions established in 1866
Islamic universities and colleges in India
1866 establishments in India
Islamic schools